Palak-e Sofla (also Romanized as Palak-e Soflá) is a village in Bala Khiyaban-e Litkuh Rural District, in the Central District of Amol County, Mazandaran Province, Iran. At the 2006 census, its population was 721, in 184 families.

References 

Populated places in Amol County